Shimpan may refer to:

 Shinpan, Ringside judges in sumo
 Shinpan, Japanese daimyō lords related to the Tokugawa shōguns